The fifth season of the television comedy series Boy Meets World aired between October 3, 1997 and May 15, 1998, on ABC in the United States. The season was produced by Michael Jacobs Productions and Touchstone Television with series creator Michael Jacobs as executive producer. It was broadcast as part of the ABC comedy block TGIF on Friday evenings.

Cast

Main 

Ben Savage as Cory Matthews
William Daniels as George Feeny 
Betsy Randle as Amy Matthews 
Will Friedle as Eric Matthews 
Rider Strong as Shawn Hunter
Danielle Fishel as Topanga Lawrence 
Lindsay Ridgeway as Morgan Matthews 
Matthew Lawrence as Jack Hunter 
William Russ as Alan Matthews

Recurring 

Trina McGee-Davis as Angela Moore

Special appearance 

Lee Norris as Stuart Minkus

Episodes

Notes

References

External links
 

1997 American television seasons
1998 American television seasons
5